The most important places in Buddhism are located in the Indo-Gangetic Plain of northern India and southern Nepal, in the area between New Delhi and Rajgir. This is the area where Gautama Buddha lived and taught, and the main sites connected to his life are now important places of pilgrimage for both Buddhists and Hindus. Many countries that are or were predominantly Buddhist have shrines and places which can be visited as a pilgrimage.

Sites associated with Buddha's life

Four main pilgrimage sites listed by Buddha himself

Gautama Buddha himself had identified the following four sites most worthy of pilgrimage for his followers, observing that these would produce a feeling of spiritual urgency:

 Lumbini: birthplace of Prince Siddhartha (in Nepal)
 Bodh Gaya: (in the current Mahabodhi Temple, Bihar, India), is the most important religious site and place of pilgrimage, the Mahabodhi Temple houses what is believed to be the Bodhi Tree where Prince Siddhārtha attained enlightenment (Nibbana) and became known as Gautama Buddha.
 Sarnath: (formally Isipathana, Uttar Pradesh, India) where Gautama Buddha delivered his first sermon (Dhammacakkappavattana Sutta), and He taught about the Middle Way, the Four Noble Truths and Noble Eightfold Path.
 Kuśinagara: (now Kushinagar, Uttar Pradesh, India) where Gautama Buddha died and attained Parinirvana.

The Eight Great Places of pilgrimage 

In addition the four sites mentioned earlier (Lumbini, Bodh Gaya, Sarnath and Kushinagar), the Buddhist texts later written by Buddha's followers also mention four more sacred sites where a certain miraculous event is reported to have occurred, thus completing the list of "Attha-mahathanani" (Pali for "The Eight Great Places") in India:

Rajgir: Place of the subduing of Nalagiri, the angry elephant, through friendliness. Rajgir was another major city of ancient India, with Nalanda nearby (14 km), a major center of Mahayana Buddhist learning.
Vaishali: Place of receiving an offering of honey from a monkey. Vaishali was the capital of the Vajjian Republic of ancient India.
Sravasti: Place of the Twin Miracle, showing his supernatural abilities in performance of miracles. Sravasti is also the place where Buddha spent the largest amount of time, being a major city in ancient India.
Sankassa: Place of the descending to earth from Tavatimsa heaven (after a stay of 3 months teaching his mother the Abhidhamma).

Other sites related to Buddha's travels 

Some other pilgrimage places in India and Nepal connected to the life of Gautama Buddha are mostly located in the Gangetic plain.

Alphabetically by states

Please help expand this incomplete list.

 Andhra Pradesh: Amaravati, Nagarjuna Konda
 Bihar: Gaya, Kesariya, Nalanda, Vaishali, Pataliputta, Vikramshila
 Haryana (in the order of travel by Buddha): Kamashpura Aastha Pugdal Pagoda (Kumashpur, place where Buddha delivered the Mahasatipatthana sutta),. Kurukshetra Stupa, Topra, Srughna (Sugh Stupa) and Chaneti Stupa were all visited by the Buddha where he gave discourse after visiting Mathura he travelled along Grand Trunk Road in Haryana (also see Buddhist pilgrimage sites in Haryana).
 Madhya Pradesh: Sanchi
 Uttar Pradesh: Devadaha, Kapilavastu, Kosambi, Mathura, Pāvā (Fazilnagar, Varanasi

Chronologically by routes 

In the order of places traveled by Buddha. Please help expand this incomplete list.

 Uttar Pradesh-Haryana travel route of Buddha
 From Mathura in Uttar Pradesh, Buddha travelled along Grand Trunk Road in Haryana (also see Buddhist pilgrimage sites in Haryana).
 Kamashpura Aastha Pugdal Pagoda (Kumashpur) in Sonipat city, the place where Buddha delivered the Mahasatipatthana sutta),. 
 Kurukshetra Stupa on the banks of sacred Brahma Sarovar in Kurukshetra city
 Topra between Kurukshetra and Yamunanagar, now has a large open air museum park housing several replica of Ashoka's edicts including largest Ashoka Chakra in the world
 Srughna, now known as the Sugh Ancient Mound, on outskirts of Yamunanagar city
 Chaneti Stupa, on outskirts of Yamunanagar city

Other pilgrimage places by country

Other famous places for Buddhist pilgrimage in various countries include:

Bhutan: Punakha Dzong, Chimi Lhakhang Temple, Kyichu Lhakhang, Kurje Lhakhang, Gangtey Monastery,  Gomphu Kora, Chagri Dorjeden Monastery, Dzongdrakha Monastery, Phajoding Monastery

Cambodia: Wat Botum, Wat Ounalom, Wat Botum, Silver Pagoda, Angkor Wat, Angkor Thom
China: Yungang Grottoes, Longmen Grottoes. The Four Sacred Mountains namely Wǔtái Shān(五台山), Éméi Shān(峨嵋山), Jiǔhuá Shān(九华山), Pǔtuó Shān(普陀山）, Potala Palace, Mount Kailash, Lake Manasarovar, Lake Nam-tso.

India: Sanchi, Nalanda, Ellora, Ajanta, also see Buddhist pilgrimage sites in India
Indonesia: Borobudur, Mendut, Sewu.
Japan: Kyoto, Nara, Shikoku Pilgrimage, Kansai Kannon Pilgrimage
Laos: Luang Prabang
Malaysia: Kek Lok Si, Buddhist Maha Vihara, Brickfields
Myanmar: Shwedagon Pagoda, Mahamuni Buddha Temple, Kyaiktiyo Pagoda, Bagan, Sagaing Hill, Mandalay Hill
Mongolia: Erdene Zuu Monastery , Gandantegchinlen Monastery, Zayiin Gegeen Monastery, Gandantegchinlen Khiid Monastery, Amarbayasgalant Khiid, Shankh Monastery
Nepal: Maya Devi Temple, Boudhanath, Swayambhunath, Kapilavastu
Pakistan: Taxila, Swat.
Sri Lanka: Anuradhapura (the Atamasthana or 'eight places'), Mihintale, Polonnaruwa, the Temple of the Tooth (Kandy), Sri Pada (the Solosmasthana Lewenth places'),
North Korea: Pohyonsa, Anguksa, Jangansa 
South Korea: Bulguksa, Three Jewel Temples
Thailand: Wat Phra Kaew, Wat Pho, Wat Doi Suthep, Phra Pathom Chedi, Sukhothai, Ayutthaya
United States of America: City of Ten Thousand Buddhas
Vietnam: Dâu Pagoda, Hương Pagoda, Mount Yen Tu

See also
Buddhist pilgrimage sites in India
Buddhist pilgrimage sites in Nepal
Shikoku Pilgrimage, Eighty-eight Temples pilgrimage in the Shikoku island, Japan
Japan 100 Kannon Pilgrimage, pilgrimage circuit that is composed of three independent pilgrimages (Saigoku, Bandō and Chichibu), consist of one hundred Temples.
 Parikrama
 Yatra

Notes

References
Chan, Khoon San, Buddhist Pilgrimage (e-book - the eight major Buddhist sites in India)

External links
Virtual Tour of Buddhist Pilgrimage Sites on Google Map (Interactive 360° View available on certain sites) 
Buddhist Pilgrimage in India and Sri Lanka
 
 Why do Buddhists go on Pilgrimage? Buddhism for Beginners